Slovenia participated at the inaugural edition of the European Games in 2015.

Medal Tables

Medals by Games

Medals by sports

List of medalists

See also
 Slovenia at the Olympics

References